Svetlana Irekovna Ishmouratova (born 20 April 1972) is a Russian biathlete. She lives in Chelyabinsk and is a soldier by profession.

Ishmouratova won the gold in the women's 15 km individual contest at the 2006 Winter Olympics.

Biography 
Svetlana Irekovna Ishmouratova was born in Zlatoust (Chelyabinsk region) . Svetlana graduated Trade Secondary School of Zlatoust first and then State Academy of Physical Education. In 1991, Ishmouratova became the USSR junior champion in individual race and the champion in senior team race. But in 1996, she was accused of doping and so was disqualified for two years. That was the end of her skiing career.

But in autumn of 1996, a coach from Moscow offered Svetlana to train with his women biathlon team. And in a year Svetlana became the champion of Russia. In 2002, at the Salt Lake City Olympics she became a bronze medalist in the relay. Four years later, she won two gold medals at the 2006 Winter Olympics, in the individual race and relay. Besides that, she has six World Champion titles (in summer and winter biathlon).

Record
Source:

Olympic Games

*Mass start was first added in 2006.

World Championships*Team was removed as an event in 1998, and pursuit was added in 1997 with mass start being added in 1999 and the mixed relay in 2005.''

References

See also 
 Russia at the 2006 Winter Olympics

1972 births
Living people
Russian female biathletes
Olympic biathletes of Russia
Biathletes at the 2002 Winter Olympics
Biathletes at the 2006 Winter Olympics
Olympic gold medalists for Russia
Olympic bronze medalists for Russia
Fifth convocation members of the State Duma (Russian Federation)
People from Zlatoust
Tatar people of Russia
Olympic medalists in biathlon
Biathlon World Championships medalists
Medalists at the 2006 Winter Olympics
Medalists at the 2002 Winter Olympics
Tatar sportspeople
Russian sportsperson-politicians